The blackthroat (Calliope obscura), also known as the black-throated robin or black-throated blue robin, is a species of bird in the family Muscicapidae. It breeds in north-central China but its wintering grounds are uncertain. It has been recorded as a vagrant in northwest Thailand. Its natural habitat is bamboo thickets within coniferous forest at altitudes of 3000–3,400 metres. It is threatened by habitat loss.

The species was discovered in 1891, but for the next 120 years only a handful of individuals were seen and to date no female has been conclusively identified. So little was known of it that it earned the title " Asia's most enigmatic robin".

In June 2011 a team of scientists discovered its breeding grounds in the Qinling Mountains, Shaanxi Province, north central China. Seven singing males were seen in Foping and a further seven in Changqing Nature Reserves- almost equal to the total number seen previously.

In 2014 a female and breeding pair were sighted.

The first formal description of the blackthroat was by the Russian ornithologists Valentin Bianchi and Mikhail Berezovski in 1891 who coined the binomial name Larvivora obscura. The species was later placed in the genus Luscinia but when a molecular phylogenetic study published in 2010 found that Luscinia was not monophyletic the genus was split and several species including blackthroat were moved to the reinstated genus Calliope.

References

Further reading

External links
 
 
 Xeno-canto: Sound recordings

Birds of Central China
Birds described in 1891
Calliope (genus)
Endemic birds of China
Taxonomy articles created by Polbot